John Ronald Simm (born 10 July 1970) is an English actor, director, and musician. He is best known for playing Sam Tyler in Life on Mars, the Master in Doctor Who, and DS Roy Grace in Grace. His other television credits include State of Play, The Lakes, Crime and Punishment, Exile, Prey, and Cracker. His film roles include Wonderland, Everyday, Boston Kickout, Human Traffic and 24 Hour Party People. He has twice been nominated for the BAFTA Award for Best Actor and the Laurence Olivier Award for Best Actor.

Early life
John Ronald Simm was born on 10 July 1970 in Leeds, the eldest of three children. His father, Ronald, was a musician from Manchester. From the age of 12, Simm sang and played guitar with his father on stage in the working men's clubs. He grew up in Lancashire in numerous places around northwest England, including Blackpool, Burnley, Colne, Manchester, and Nelson. He attended Edge End High School in Nelson, where he was inspired by his drama teacher Brian Wellock. In 1986, he enrolled in a three-year performing arts course at Blackpool and The Fylde College in Blackpool. He starred in Guys and Dolls and West Side Story at Blackpool's Grand Theatre. After appearing in the next college musical, The Boyfriend, he decided that musical theatre did not interest him, and joined an amateur dramatic group to hone his skills in his spare time, playing the title roles in Billy Liar and Amadeus. He then moved to London at the age of 19 to train at the Drama Centre London, where he studied Stanislavski's system of method acting.

Career
In 1992, Simm made his professional acting debut playing the role of Joby Johnson in an episode of the TV series Rumpole of the Bailey. He appeared as a psycho in The Bill, as lovestruck schoolboy Richard Francis in Heartbeat, and as a drugged-up burglar in The Locksmith. From 1993, he played the lead role of Kendle Bains in two series of the BBC sitcom Men of the World. In 1995, he undertook the role of Gary Kingston, a deluded murderer, in Chiller.

In 1995, Simm played the troubled teenager Bill Preece in ITV police drama Cracker. He also made his feature film debut in Boston Kickout, which won the Palmarés (Best) Feature Film award at the 11th Cinema Jove - Valencia International Film Festival 1996.  

In 1996, he made his professional stage debut in the Simon Bent play Goldhawk Road at the Bush Theatre, directed by Paul Miller. In 1997 - 1999, he played lead role of Danny Kavanagh in The Lakes, a BBC series written by Jimmy McGovern. In 1999, he starred as Jip in the award-winning cult clubbing film Human Traffic and as Eddie in Michael Winterbottom's Wonderland. 

In 2000, he starred in the opening episode of the BBC drama Clocking Off, written by Paul Abbott, with whom he would work again in 2002 when he starred as Cal McCaffrey in the multi-award-winning political thriller series State of Play. Simm also played the lead role of loan shark John Parlour in Tony Marchant's Never Never for Channel 4.

In 2002, Simm featured in the film 24 Hour Party People as New Order frontman Bernard Sumner. It was also this year that he played Raskolnikov in the BBC adaptation of Crime and Punishment, adapted by Tony Marchant. Marchant also wrote The Knight's Tale, one of a series of modern reworkings of The Canterbury Tales, in which Simm played Ace. Later that year, Simm starred opposite Christina Ricci and John Hurt in the film Miranda.

In 2004, he played the researcher and charity investigator Daniel Appleton in the BAFTA award-winning Channel 4 drama Sex Traffic, which followed the plight of two young Moldovan sisters sold into sexual slavery: earning Simm a best actor nomination at the 20th Gemini Awards. After playing Dr. Bruce Flaherty in Howard Davies' production of Joe Penhall's Blue/Orange, Simm starred as Detective Inspector Sam Tyler in the 2006 BBC series Life on Mars, playing a police officer sent back in time to 1973. The show won the Pioneer Audience Award for Best Programme at the 2007 BAFTA TV Awards, Simm was nominated but lost out on the award for Best Actor.

In March 2007, he starred in Channel 4's The Yellow House, a biographical drama produced by Talkback Thames, about the turbulent relationship of artists Vincent van Gogh (Simm) and Paul Gauguin (John Lynch) when they shared a home named The Yellow House for several months; the production is based on Martin Gayford's book, also titled The Yellow House. In the same year, Simm returned to the theatre as the title character in Paul Miller's acclaimed Bush Theatre staging of Simon Bent's version of Elling, a comedy about two men just out of a psychiatric hospital adjusting to normal life and to each other. Following positive press reviews and an extended, sell-out run, the production was transferred to the Trafalgar Studios in July 2007 and Simm was nominated for an Olivier Award for his performance.

In 2007, Simm was cast by Russell T Davies to play an incarnation of the Master, the nemesis of the Doctor, in the long-running BBC series Doctor Who. He appeared in the final three episodes of the third series: "Utopia", "The Sound of Drums", and "Last of the Time Lords". When originally cast, it was announced that he would be playing a character by the name of Mr. Saxon, a name that was later revealed as an alias of The Master. He reprised the role in the 2009 two-part special, "The End of Time". In 2008, he played Edward Sexby in The Devil's Whore, a four-part English Civil War epic for Channel 4. He performed at the Royal Variety Performance with Alexander Armstrong and Ben Miller, and starred in the film Skellig, in 2009.

Simm became involved in an ongoing project with Michael Winterbottom called Everyday, to be filmed in real time over five years. The film premiered at the Toronto International Film Festival in September 2012, and was in competition at the 2013 London Film Festival. Simm returned to the West End stage in autumn of 2009 to critical acclaim, starring in the Andrew Bovell play Speaking in Tongues at the Duke of York's Theatre. 

In September 2010, Simm played Hamlet at the Sheffield Crucible.

In 2011, Simm starred in Mad Dogs on Sky 1. He played Baxter in the project, that reunited him with Philip Glenister and Marc Warren along with Max Beesley and Ben Chaplin. Mad Dogs became a critical and ratings success and received a BAFTA nomination for best drama serial, and a second and third series were commissioned. The second series was shot in Mallorca and Ibiza in late 2011, and appeared on Sky 1 in January 2012, the same time as the third series was being shot in South Africa. A final series aired in January 2014. On BBC One in May 2011, Simm starred as Tom Rondstadt in Exile, alongside Jim Broadbent, Olivia Colman, and his wife, Kate Magowan. His performance earned him his second BAFTA nomination for Best Actor.

From 17 May to 9 June 2012, Simm starred as Jerry in a revival of Harold Pinter's Betrayal at the Crucible Theatre. He played John Middleton in The Village, a six-part BBC drama which portrays life in a Derbyshire village during World War I.

From May to August 2013, he returned to Trafalgar Studios in London's West End to star opposite Simon Russell Beale in a new production of Harold Pinter's The Hothouse, directed by Jamie Lloyd. He then completed work on the three-part thriller, Prey, in which he plays detective Marcus Farrow. The mini-series began airing on 28 April 2014 on ITV. The second series starred Philip Glenister in the leading role.

In February 2014, Simm began filming the BBC America eight-parter Intruders in Vancouver, British Columbia. He plays ex-LAPD officer Jack Whelan. The series aired on BBC America in August 2014,  and also starred Mira Sorvino, James Frain and Millie Bobby Brown. It was cancelled after only one season. In addition to this, he completed the second season of The Village in Derbyshire.
Later that year, Simm played Alec Jeffreys, the man who discovered DNA fingerprinting, in Code of a Killer, a two-part drama for ITV.

In 2015, he took a break from the screen to concentrate on theatre. He appeared for the first time at The National Theatre, playing the role of Rakitin to great acclaim, in Patrick Marber's Three Days in the Country, (a version of Turgenev's A Month in the Country) and was reunited with Jamie Lloyd, playing the role of Lenny in the 50th anniversary production of Harold Pinter's The Homecoming in London's West End.

In 2016, Simm was invited to the US to act in The Catch for ABC. Starring Mireille Enos and Peter Krause, the show was executive produced by Shonda Rhimes and filmed at Sunset Bronson studios and on location around Los Angeles. Simm played the character of Rhys Griffiths, a recurring character in season 1 and a regular in season 2. 

On 6 April 2017, the BBC confirmed that Simm would be reprising his role as the Master in the tenth series of Doctor Who; he appeared in the two-part finale, "World Enough and Time" and "The Doctor Falls".

In 2018, he starred as Dan Bowker opposite Adrian Lester in Mike Bartlett's Trauma on ITV. The same year he also played the role of Labour MP David Mars in Collateral, written by David Hare, opposite Carey Mulligan and Billie Piper for the BBC. He then starred in Strangers on ITV, starring as Jonah Mulray, a professor whose life comes crashing down when his wife is killed in a car crash in Hong Kong.

In 2018/2019,  Simm returned to the West End stage in Jamie Lloyd's staging of Pinter at the Pinter—a groundbreaking season of Harold Pinter's one-act plays. He starred in Pinter Six, consisting of Party Time and Celebration.

In 2019, he played the title role of Macbeth at the Chichester Festival Theatre. later that year it was announced he would be reprising his role as the Master again in Masterful, an audio drama from Big Finish Productions. 

In 2021, Simm played the title role of DS Roy Grace in Grace , a Russell Lewis adaption, based on Peter James's best-selling crime fiction series novels.

Music
Throughout the 1990s and early 2000s, Simm was a founding member, songwriter, and guitarist with the rock band Magic Alex; the band was named after "Magic Alex" Mardas, a Greek electronics engineer best known for his work with the Beatles. The group played support on two British tours with Echo & the Bunnymen. Simm plays guitar on the album Slideling by his friend, Echo & the Bunnymen singer Ian McCulloch. In 2002, at a live concert in Finsbury Park, he sang the Joy Division song "Digital" onstage with New Order. He also played lead guitar on a few of McCulloch's solo live shows, including one at Wembley Arena as the main support to Coldplay. Magic Alex released one album, Dated and Sexist, before splitting in 2005, after Simm decided to concentrate on acting.

Personal life
In April 2004, Simm married actress Kate Magowan in the Forest of Dean. Simm and Magowan have appeared together in four films: 24 Hour Party People, Is Harry On The Boat?, the award-winning short film Devilwood and the heist thriller Tuesday, as well as in the BBC Series Exile. They have two children: son Ryan and daughter Mollie. 

Simm is a supporter of Manchester United FC.

Filmography

Film

Television

Stage

Music videos

Discography

Album

Singles

Awards and nominations

References

External links

 
 The Man Who Fell to Earth, Sunday Telegraph interview 5 August 2007

21st-century British guitarists
21st-century British male musicians
20th-century English people
21st-century English people
1970 births
Alumni of the Drama Centre London
English male film actors
English rock guitarists
English male guitarists
English male stage actors
English male television actors
Living people
Male actors from Lancashire
Male actors from Leeds
People from Nelson, Lancashire